Events from the year 1952 in Sweden

Incumbents
 Monarch – Gustaf VI Adolf
 Prime Minister – Tage Erlander

Events
June – The Catalina affair
21 September – Swedish general election
25 October – The Swedish Basketball Federation is founded out of the Swedish Handball Federation's basketball section.
unknown date – The paratrooper training school Fallskärmsjägarna (FJS) is established.

Popular culture

Film
12 August – The Firebird released

Births

23 February – Sören Åkeby, football player
25 February – Tomas Ledin, singer and songwriter
21 March – Håkan Lindström, sailor.
7 May – Stanley Dickens, racing driver
12 May – Christer Garpenborg, athlete.
29 May – Carl-Henric Svanberg, businessman
14 June – Suzanne Reuter, actress
15 July – Christian Palme, communications expert, journalist and writer
10 August – Ulf Weinstock, ice hockey player.
10 September – Gustav Levin, actor

Deaths

12 July – Konrad Törnqvist, football player (born 1888).
2 September – Hans von Rosen, horse rider (born 1888)
24 December – Anton Johanson, football player and manager (born 1877)
 Anna von Zweigbergk, reporter (born 1865)

References

 
Sweden
Years of the 20th century in Sweden